Fossen (literally, 'the waterfall') is a waterfall along the Sjønstå River in Nordland county, Norway. It is about  upriver from the Sjønstå farm in the municipality of Fauske.

In 1892, the Sulitjelma Line was built between Sjønstå and Fossen, replacing an unimproved road from 1888. Ore from Sulitjelma Mines was transported by boat across Langvatnet (Long Lake) from Sulitjelma to Fossen, and then by rail from Fossen to Sjønstå to be taken by boat via Øvervatnet (Upper Lake) and Nedrevatnet (Lower Lake), so that it could be sent by ship from Finneid along Skjerstad Fjord. The line was extended from Fossen to Hellarmo a year later.

The Sulitjelma Line was discontinued on July 23, 1972 and the station at Fossen is no longer used.

References

Waterfalls of Norway
Fauske